Rosalba, la fanciulla di Pompei (Rosalba, the girl of Pompei) is a 1952 Italian musical melodrama film.

Cast

Roberto Risso: Giorgio de Montera
Silvana Muzi: Rosalba Ambrosano
Natale Montillo: Andrea Ambrosano
Elli Parvo: Laura
Renato Baldini: Vittorio Stelio
Ugo D'Alessio: Nicolino
Beniamino Maggio: Beniamino
Maria Piazzai: Maria Rosa
Renato Vicario: Tonino
Leda Gloria: Vicina di casa

External links
 

1952 films
1950s Italian-language films
Italian musical drama films
1950s musical drama films
Italian black-and-white films
Melodrama films
1950s Italian films